Wainman is a surname. Notable people with the surname include:

James Wainman (born 1993), English cricketer
Phil Wainman (born 1946), British record producer and songwriter
Tracey Wainman (born 1968), Canadian figure skater

See also
Weinman